Rhodolaena is a genus of trees and shrubs in the family Sarcolaenaceae. The species are all endemic to Madagascar. The monophyly of the genus is unresolved.

Species
Seven species are recognised:
 Rhodolaena acutifolia  
 Rhodolaena altivola  
 Rhodolaena bakeriana  
 Rhodolaena coriacea  
 Rhodolaena humblotii  
 Rhodolaena leroyana  
 Rhodolaena macrocarpa

References

 
Malvales genera